Henry Franklin Winkler (born October 30, 1945) is an American actor, executive producer, and director.

General overview

Winkler grew up in New York and was a student in the Yale School of Drama. During the summers, he and his Yale classmates stayed in New Haven and opened a summer stock theater called the "New Haven Free Theater." They performed various plays including Woyzeck, and Just Add Water (improv night). He also performed in the political piece The American Pig at the Joseph Papp Public Theater for the New York Shakespeare Festival in New York City, along with classmates James Keach, James Naughton, and Jill Eikenberry.

After graduation, he joined the Yale Repertory Theatre company. During the 1970-71 season, Winkler appeared in Story Theater Reportory (October 1970) as the Rabbi in Gimpel the Fool (and also appeared in Saint Julian the Hospitaler and Olympian Games). He also appeared as the youngest son in The Revenger's Tragedy (Nov-December, 1970), Tommy's nephew in Where Has Tommy Flowers Gone? (January 1971), Young Siward in Macbeth (Feb-March 1971), Andres in Woyzeck and Play (April 1971), and Master of Ceremonies/Prow/Couple 2/Horses/Milliner in Two by Brecht and Weill: The Little Mahagonny and The Seven Deadly Sins (May–June, 1971 and January 20–29, 1972.

Winkler then moved back to New York, working in theater, television commercials, and the independent film The Lords of Flatbush (1974), with then unknown Sylvester Stallone. After a short period in Los Angeles, he won the role of Arthur "Fonzie" Fonzarelli (on the 1974-1984 American television series Happy Days). He also portrayed Jack Dunne in Heroes (1977), Andy in the Carl Reiner film The One and Only (1978), and Chuck Lumley in Ron Howard's Night Shift (1982). In addition, he gained recognition as an executive producer for works such as MacGyver, Dead Man's Gun, the CBS Schoolbreak Special: "All the Kids Do It", Hollywood Squares, and Who Are the DeBolts? And Where Did They Get Nineteen Kids?

Winkler has evolved into a character actor, portraying roles such as the high school principal Arthur Himbry in Scream, Coach Klein in Adam Sandler's The Waterboy, Barry Zuckerkorn in Arrested Development, Sy Mittleman in Childrens Hospital, Dr. Saperstein in Parks and Recreation, Mr. Rock in the Hank Zipzer BBC series, Eddie R. Lawson in Royal Pains, Fritz in Monsters at Work, Uncle Joe in The French Dispatch, Al Pratt (Uncle Al) in Black Adam, and Gene Cousineau in Barry. He also appears in five Christmas films: An American Christmas Carol as Benedict Slade (1979), Katharine Hepburn's last film One Christmas as Dad (1994), The Most Wonderful Time of the Year as Uncle Ralph (2008), Mr. Rock in Hank Zipzer's Christmas Catastrophe (2016), and Grandpa Bill in All I Want For Christmas is You (2017). In 1986, he directed Dolly Parton in A Smoky Mountain Christmas.

Film

Television

Theater

Yale School of Drama (1967–1970)
Winkler  appeared in They Told Me That You Came This Way, Any Day Now, Any Day Now, and The Bacchae (as a member of the chorus). During the summers, he and his Yale classmates stayed in New Haven, and opened a summer stock theater called the New Haven Free Theater. They performed various plays including Woyzeck, where he portrayed the title role, and Just Add Water for improv night. He also performed in the political piece, The American Pig at the Joseph Papp Public Theater for the New York Shakespeare Festival in New York City, with classmates James Keach, James Naughton, and Jill Eikenberry. In addition, he also appeared in a number of Yale Repertory Theatre productions while still a student, including, The Government Inspector, The Rhesus Umbrella, Don Juan, Endgame, and The Physicists. He also appeared in Sweeney Agonistes and Hughie.

Yale Repertory Theater (1970–1972)
After receiving his MFA in 1970, Winkler was one of three students from his graduating class of 11 who were invited to become a part of the Yale Repertory Theatre company. He joined on June 30, 1970, was paid $173 a week, and appeared throughout the 1970–71 season. He performed in Story Theater Reportory, Gimpel the Fool and Saint Julian the Hospitaler and Olympian Games. He also appeared in The Revenger's Tragedy, Where Has Tommy Flowers Gone?, Macbeth, and Woyzeck and Play. He also appeared in a double feature of two works by Bertolt Brecht, The Seven Deadly Sins (ballet chanté), and The Little Mahagonny during May–June 1971 and during January 20–29, 1972.

1973-present

See also
List of awards and nominations received by Henry Winkler

References

External links
Henry Winkler at IMDb
Henry Winkler at Internet Broadway Database

Early career
Woyzeck and Play (Image of Henry Winkler) - Yale Repertory Theatre, April 1–24, 1971.
Henry Winkler remembers first big break with Mary Tyler Moore - CNN, January 25, 2017.

Happy Days
MeTV Presents The Best of the Fonz - MeTV 
Winkler Recalls Robin Williams' 'Happy Days' Debut - Rachel Maddow, MSNBC, August 12, 2014

Later career
LA Times Today: ‘Barry’s’ Henry Winkler on life on and off screen - Los Angeles Times, June 7, 2022

Male actor filmographies
American filmographies